Christa Johnson (born April 25, 1958) is an American professional golfer. She became a member of the LPGA Tour in 1980 and won nine LPGA Tour events, including one major championship, during her career.

Amateur career
Born in Arcata, California, Johnson won the 1975 Northern California Junior Girls Championship and was honored as a member of the Northern California International Junior Cup Team. She attended the University of Arizona in Tucson, where she was an All-American from 1979–80 for the Wildcats.

Professional career
Johnson joined the LPGA Tour in 1980. She won nine tournaments on the LPGA Tour, the first of them in 1984 and the last in 1997. Her one major championship title came at the 1997 McDonald's LPGA Championship. Her best money list finish was fourth, also in 1997. She won four tournaments on the Legends Tour, the official senior tour of the LPGA. She was a member of the USA Team during the 2006 through 2014 Handa Cups (USA winning in all years except 2013), official world team challenge of the senior tour.

Johnson resides in Arizona with husband, Duane A. Bernard, CEO of Phoenix Health Services, and former CEO of Specialty Health and St. Catherine Healthcare, whom she married in March 2007. Johnson also played under the name Chris Johnson from 1980 to 1985.

Professional wins

LPGA Tour wins (9)

LPGA Tour playoff record (1–1)

LPGA of Japan Tour wins (1)
1985 Yamaha Cup Ladies Open

Legends Tour wins (5)
2006 (1) BJ's Charity Championship (with Nancy Scranton)
2007 (1) BJ's Charity Championship (with Nancy Scranton)
2009 (1) Wendy's Charity Challenge
2011 (1) Patty Sheehan & Friends Legends Tour Event
2019 (1) Janesville LPGA Senior Pro-Am

Major championships

Wins (1)

1 Won in a sudden death playoff.

Team appearances
Professional
Solheim Cup (representing the United States): 1998 (winners)
Handa Cup (representing the United States): 2006 (winners), 2007 (winners), 2008 (winners), 2009 (winners), 2010 (winners), 2011 (winners), 2012 (tie, Cup retained), 2013, 2014 (winners), 2015 (winners)

External links

American female golfers
Arizona Wildcats women's golfers
LPGA Tour golfers
Winners of LPGA major golf championships
Solheim Cup competitors for the United States
Golfers from California
Golfers from Arizona
People from Arcata, California
1958 births
Living people